The 2022 California Insurance Commissioner election was held on November 8, 2022, to elect the Insurance Commissioner of California. Under California's nonpartisan blanket primary law, all candidates appeared on the same ballot, regardless of party. In the primary, voters may vote for any candidate, regardless of their party affiliation. The top two finishers — regardless of party — advanced to the general election in November, even if a candidate managed to receive a majority of the votes cast in the primary election. Incumbent Democratic Insurance Commissioner Ricardo Lara won re-election to a second term.

Primary 
The statewide top-two primary election will take place on June 7, 2022.

Candidates

Democratic Party 
 Vinson Eugene Allen, emergency physician
 Jasper "Jay" Jackson, paralegal
 Ricardo Lara, incumbent Insurance Commissioner (2019–present)
 Marc Levine, state assemblyman for California's 10th State Assembly district (2013–present)

Republican Party 
 Greg Conlon, businessman and perennial candidate
 Robert Howell, cybersecurity equipment manufacturer

Green Party 
 Veronika Fimbres, nurse

Peace and Freedom Party 
Nathalie Hrizi, teacher, community activist and perennial candidate

No party preference 
 Robert J. Molnar, healthcare advocate

Endorsements

Primary election

Results

General election

Polling

Results

Notes

See also 
 2022 California elections
 2022 California gubernatorial election

References 

Insurance Commissioner
California Insurance Commissioner elections
California